Shaykh Khanda Jhokmok was a 14th-century Sufi Muslim figure in the Sylhet region.

Biography
He was born in the 13th century. His birth name is not known, but he was given the nickname of Khanda Jhokmok which means shiny khanda or glittering falchion in the Bengali language. Other sources have also referred to him as Jhanda Jhakmak (shiny flag).

Career
After taking the company of Shah Jalal, he contributed in the final battle of the Conquest of Sylhet in 1303 against Raja Gour Govinda.

Death
It is unclear how and what year he died, but he was buried in a mazar (mausoleum) in Raynagar, Sylhet.

See also
History of Sylhet
Sylhet region

References

People from Sylhet
14th-century Indian Muslims
Bengali Sufi saints